Alexippus was an ancient Greek physician who was mentioned by Plutarch as having received a letter from Alexander the Great himself, to thank him for having cured one of his officers, a man named Peucestas, of a wound incurred during a bear hunt probably around 327 BC.

References

Physicians of Alexander the Great
4th-century BC Greek physicians